Tough Love & Parables is Bizzle's first Christian hip hop album released on his own label, God Over Money. It debuted at No. 15 on the Billboard Gospel Albums chart.

Track listing

References 

Bizzle albums
Albums produced by Boi-1da
2011 debut albums